Entrepreneur India is a monthly business magazine targeted at Indian business owners and entrepreneurial enthusiasts. It is published by Entrepreneur India Media Pvt. Ltd. – a joint venture between Entrepreneur Media, USA's business magazine for entrepreneurs, and Franchise India, an Indian company providing integrated franchise solutions since 1999 in various Asian countries. Entrepreneur India Media publishes the Entrepreneur magazine in India, as well as hosting the Entrepreneur website in the country.

Background 
The magazine was relaunched in India in July 2015 by Entrepreneur India Media for Indian readers interested in business and entrepreneurial stories and information. It was earlier licensed by Network18 group.

References

External links
 https://www.entrepreneur.com/us
 https://www.entrepreneur.com/in
 http://www.afaqs.com/news/story/45081_Entrepreneur-magazine-relaunched-in-India

Business magazines published in India